Faughan Hill is a low hill approximately five miles to the northwest of Navan, County Meath, Ireland. It is owned by the Moriarty, McCabe, Dunne, English families, and is not open to the public. The highest point is owned by the Moriarty family.

Because the surrounding area of Meath is so flat, the hill is the most prominent feature in the local topography. Historians and folklorists believe that the hill's name originated from fraughan berries which in mediaeval times were recorded as growing all around it. 

According to legend, Niall of the Nine Hostages, Irish Árd Rí (High King) and ancestor of the Uí Néill, is buried in a cave on the hill. 

The small village of Greetiagh is located at the foot of the hill. In 1920, the local Royal Irish Constabulary barracks in the village was attacked and burned by republicans during the Irish War of Independence.

The hill was wooded with a hunting gap through its centre until it was cleared in 1962 by the McCabe's. In the 1970s, Sean Dunne opened a large quarry on its southern side; later closed, the quarry was reopened in the 1990s and in the 2000s. Since then, a telecommunications mast has been erected which provides coverage to a wide area.

History of County Meath
Mountains and hills of County Meath